The 1953 Bucknell Bison football team was an American football team that represented Bucknell University as an independent during the 1953 college football season. 

In its seventh season under head coach Harry Lawrence, the team compiled a 1–8 record. Paul Ganz, Bill Gray and Jim Egloff were the team captains.

The team played its home games at Memorial Stadium on the university campus in Lewisburg, Pennsylvania.

Schedule

References

Bucknell
Bucknell Bison football seasons
Bucknell Bison football